Giuseppe Parini (23 May 1729 – 15 August 1799) was an Italian enlightenment satirist and poet of the neoclassic period.

Biography
Parini (originally spelled Parino) was born in Bosisio (later renamed Bosisio Parini in his honour) in Brianza, Lombardy from a poor family. His father, who was a petty silk trader, sent him to Milan under the care of his great aunt: there he studied under the Barnabites in the Arcimboldi Academy, while earning a living by copying manuscripts. In 1741 his great aunt left him a monthly payment, on  condition that he enter the priesthood. Parini was thus ordained, although his religious studies were not profitable because of his need to work in a lawyer's office during his free time and his intolerance of the old-fashioned teaching methods used.

In 1752, he published at Lugano, under the pseudonym of "Ripano Eupilino", a small volume of selected poems, Alcune poesie, which secured his election to the Accademia dei Trasformati at Milan, as well as to the Accademia dell'Arcadia at Rome. His poem, Il Giorno (The Day), consisting of ironic instructions to a young nobleman as to the best method of spending his days, which was to be published in three parts, marked a distinct advance in Italian blank verse. The first part, Il Mattino (Morning), was published in 1763 and at once established Parini's popularity and influence, and two years later a continuation (the second part) was published under the title of Il Mezzogiorno (Midday).

The Austrian plenipotentiary in Milan, Count Karl Joseph von Firmian, saw to the poet's advancement, first by appointing him editor of the Milan Gazette, and then in 1769, in spite of the Jesuits, to a specially created chair of belles lettres in the Palatine school. When the French occupied Milan, Parini was appointed magistrate by Napoleon, but almost immediately retired to resume his literary work and to complete his poem by writing the third part, La Sera (Evening), of "The Day". But time had passed, he had become unsure, so he divided the third part in two, Il Vespro (Vesper) and La Notte (Night), published, both unfinished, after his death, which along with two other previous parts form what is collectively titled Il Giorno. 
Among other poems his rather artificial Odi, composed between 1757 and 1795, have appeared in various editions. 
He was associated with the Accademia della Crusca.

Parini's work was accepted by younger poets mainly as a lesson in morality and freedom of thought. Ugo Foscolo, who met Parini in Milan, portrayed him as a serious, dignified person in Ultime lettere di Jacopo Ortis and criticized the rich and corrupt town which had forgotten him, in Dei sepolcri.

He died in August 1799 in Milan. A statue of the poet occupies a place of honour in Milan's busy Piazzale Cordusio. His family still survives, with Katrine Cereda-Parini being the youngest known relative to continue the name to this day.

Libretto
Ascanio in Alba, music by Wolfgang Amadeus Mozart (1771)

Publications 
Giuseppe Parini (trans. Herbert Morris Bower). The Day Morning, Midday, Evening, Night : a Poem. Westport, Conn: Hyperion Press, 1978.

References

External links
 

1729 births
1799 deaths
People from the Province of Lecco
Italian Roman Catholics
18th-century Italian poets
Italian male poets
Italian satirists
Western Lombard language
Italian male non-fiction writers
Wolfgang Amadeus Mozart's librettists
18th-century non-fiction writers
18th-century Italian male writers